Ojukwu is a family name of Nigerian origin, and may refer to:

 Bianca Odumegwu-Ojukwu (1968-) Nigerian politician, diplomat, lawyer, and businesswoman
 C. Odumegwu Ojukwu (1933–2011), aka Emeka Ojukwu, Nigerian military officer, statesman and politician 
 Ernest Ojukwu (1960-), Nigerian professor of law